Ebenezer Wilson was the 29th Mayor of New York City from 1707 to 1710.

Mayors of New York City